South Windham is a village and census-designated place (CDP) in Windham County, Connecticut, United States. It is located within the town of Windham, Connecticut.  The population was 1,421 at the 2010 census.

Geography
According to the United States Census Bureau, the CDP has a total area of 8.1 km (3.1 mi2).  8.1 km (3.1 mi2) of it is land and 0.1 km (0.04 mi2) of it (0.96%) is water.

Climate

Demographics
As of the census of 2000, there were 1,278 people, 517 households, and 350 families residing in the CDP.  The population density was 158.7/km (411.0/mi2).  There were 579 housing units at an average density of 71.9/km (186.2/mi2).  The racial makeup of the CDP was 95.07% White, 0.47% African American, 0.31% Native American, 0.16% Asian, 2.90% from other races, and 1.10% from two or more races. Hispanic or Latino of any race were 5.79% of the population.

There were 517 households, out of which 25.1% had children under the age of 18 living with them, 56.1% were married couples living together, 7.9% had a female householder with no husband present, and 32.3% were non-families. 23.2% of all households were made up of individuals, and 8.9% had someone living alone who was 65 years of age or older.  The average household size was 2.47 and the average family size was 2.90.

In the CDP the population was spread out, with 19.4% under the age of 18, 7.8% from 18 to 24, 29.6% from 25 to 44, 29.6% from 45 to 64, and 13.6% who were 65 years of age or older.  The median age was 41 years. For every 100 females, there were 101.3 males.  For every 100 females age 18 and over, there were 102.4 males.

The median income for a household in the CDP was $51,282, and the median income for a family was $52,434. Males had a median income of $35,428 versus $31,944 for females. The per capita income for the CDP was $24,113.  About 1.8% of families and 3.0% of the population were below the poverty line, including 4.1% of those under age 18 and none of those age 65 or over.

References

Census-designated places in Windham County, Connecticut
Villages in Connecticut
Windham, Connecticut